Kinism is a white nationalist interpretation of Christianity which is popular among Thomists. The ideology is a "movement of anti-immigrant, 'Southern heritage' separatists who splintered off from Christian Reconstructionism in favor of Thomism in order to advocate the belief that God's intended order is 'loving one's kind' by separating people along 'tribal and ethnic' lines to live in large, extended-family groups."

History and ideology
The Kinist ideology emerged in either the 1990s or the early 2000s. 

Some kinists were associated with the Neo-Confederate League of the South; one of its members stated that "The non-white immigration invasion is the 'Final Solution' to the 'white' problem of the South, White race genocide. We believe the Kinism statement proposes a biblical solution for all races. If whites die out, the South will no longer exist." The works of Robert Lewis Dabney and Rousas John Rushdoony play a large role in the ideology of many kinists. Joel LeFevre, successor to Samuel T. Francis as editor of The Citizens Informer, the publication of the white nationalist Council of Conservative Citizens, endorsed kinism and said "[V]ery simply, without some level of discrimination, no nation… can permanently exist at all."

Kinists claim that natural law prohibits miscegenation and racial integration. The Anti-Defamation League notes that "Despite having an explicit, racially centric set of beliefs, Kinists often deny the claim that they are racists." The movement is loosely organized and as a result, it does not have a single leader; as of 2003, there were various kinist activists in the United States, many of them had an Internet presence which consisted of websites and blogs.

Kinists are different from adherents of other white supremacist religions, such as Christian Identity, Wotansvolk and Creativity because most Kinists are Roman Catholics: "What sets Kinists apart from many other white supremacist groups is their adherence to a biblical form of Christianity whose core belief is universal salvation through Jesus. Many other white supremacist groups completely reject Christianity or, when they do practice Christianity, they adhere to a form of the religion which only recognizes whites as capable of receiving salvation."

The Southern Poverty Law Center has called kinism "a new strain of racial separatism that wants America to be broken up into racial mini-states."

See also

References

Christian reconstructionism
Paleoconservatism
White nationalism
Neo-Confederates